Muḥammad ibn Barakāt ibn Ḥasan ibn ‘Ajlān (‎; 1437) was Sharif of Mecca from 1455 to 1497. As a vassal of the Sultan of Egypt his authority extended over the entire Hejaz.

He was born in Ramadan 840 AH (March/April 1437), the son of Barakat I, Sharif of Mecca. In 859 AH (1455) Barakat's health deteriorated, and he petitioned the Sultan to appoint his son as his replacement. Barakat died on Monday, 19 Sha'ban 859 AH (4 August 1455), and it so happened that the Sultan's reply—dated 16 Rajab 859 AH—arrived from Egypt the following day, accompanied by a robe of investiture (khil'ah) for Sharif Muhammad. On 4 Shawwal Muhammad received condolences from the Sultan and his formal decree of appointment (tawqi).

In the year 878 AH (1473/1474) Sultan Qaitbay appointed Muhammad's son Barakat as co-regent.

Sharif Muhammad died on 11 Muharram 903 AH at Wadi Marr al-Zahran (present-day Wadi Fatimah). He was buried in the Cemetery of al-Ma'lah in Mecca, and a tomb was built over his grave.

Issue
He had sixteen sons, besides daughters. Among his sons were:
Humaydah, Sharif of Mecca
Jazan, Sharif of Mecca
Hazza', Sharif of Mecca
Barakat II, Sharif of Mecca
Qayitbay, Sharif of Mecca
Ali
Rajih
Rumaythah

References

Bibliography

1437 births
1497 deaths
15th-century Arabs
Sharifs of Mecca